Evergestis isatidalis is a species of moth in the family Crambidae. It is found in France, Spain, Portugal, Italy, Croatia, Greece, Turkey and North Africa, including Algeria.

The wingspan is 28–34 mm. Adults are on wing from December to January.

The larvae feed on Isatis tinctoria, Raphanus raphanistrum and Eruca vesicaria. Along the coast, larvae are found from February to March. Inland, they live from April to May.

References

Moths described in 1833
Evergestis
Moths of Europe
Moths of Asia
Moths of Africa